Khallet el Hamra or Khallet Hamra is a ravine or wadi joining the larger Wadi Yaroun located  southeast of Ain Ebelin the Bint Jbeil District of Nabatieh Governorate in Lebanon.

A Heavy Neolithic archaeological site of the Qaraoun culture was discovered by jesuit archaeologist Paul Bovier-Lapierre in 1908. Bovier-Lapierre considered several of the axes found to be Chellean with one exceptionally large and finely made Acheulean chopper. Henri Fleisch re-evaluated the materials in light of more modern studies and noted the finds to be only sparsely Acheulean with the assemblage consisting of predominantly "abundant" Heavy Neolithic tools of the Qaraoun culture.

References

External links
3D Google Earth map of Khallet el Hamra on www.gmap3d.com
Khallet el Hamra on www.geographic.org

Bint Jbeil District
Archaeological sites in Lebanon
Heavy Neolithic sites
Neolithic settlements